Simone Hyams (born 4 October 1971 in Hammersmith, London, UK) is a former actress, best known for her role as Caroline "Calley" Donnington in the BBC school drama, Grange Hill, from 1985 to 1991.

Other roles included parts in The Bill, Baywatch and a walk-on part in Michael Winner’s 1993 film Dirty Weekend.

She subsequently worked as a corporate events manager for Richard Branson's Virgin Group.

References

External links
 
 Simone Hyams Star File at Grange Hill Online

1971 births
Living people
British television actresses